Wicha may refer to:

Places
 The Domesday Book spelling of Wicken, Cambridgeshire

People with the first name
 Wicha Nantasri (born 1986), Thai footballer

People with the surname
 Marcin Wicha (born 1972), Polish writer
 Władysław Wicha (1904-1984), Polish politician